San Mateo is a district of the San Mateo canton, in the Alajuela province of Costa Rica.

Geography 
San Mateo has an area of  km² and an elevation of  metres. It is located in the coastal lowlands near the central Pacific coast, 31 kilometers east of Caldera Port, 44 kilometers southwest of the provincial capital city of Alajuela and 53 kilometers from the national capital city of San Jose.

Demographics 

For the 2011 census, San Mateo had a population of  inhabitants.

Transportation

Road transportation 
The district is covered by the following road routes:
 National Route 3
 National Route 131

References 

Districts of Alajuela Province
Populated places in Alajuela Province